TER Provence Alpes-Côte-d'Azur (TER PACA) is the regional rail network serving the Provence-Alpes-Côte d'Azur region in France. This network is operated by SNCF. 
The public transport authority, the Regional Council, runs 800 trains a day, especially near Avignon, Marseille, Toulon and Nice. 100,000 users take regional trains each day.

Network 

The network is made up of 17 train lines. All bus lines are operated by private operators under the Regional Council Authority.

Unlike most other regions in France, the Provence-Alpes-Côte d'Azur separates their trains into two services: 
 TER : suburban or local services, with only 2nd class wagons. These trains are operated with multiple units. 
 Intervilles : regional InterCity trains (not to be confused with InterCités trains, a nationwide service), with 1st and 2nd class, except between Marseille, Gap and Briançon.

This separation is done due to the presence of big metropolises on the coast (Marseille, Toulon and Nice) and a very rural hinterland (French Alps). Toulon does not have suburban services, as these are absorbed into Marseille.

Rail 

The rail network as of May 2022:

Rail service not part of the TER Provence-Alpes-Côte d'Azur network:
 Nice CP – Digne-les-Bains, operated by the Chemins de Fer de Provence

Future 

With the building of the new LN Provence-Côte d'Azur line between Marseille and Monaco expected by 2030, regional traffic may grow. This will be achieved through the introduction of a new high speed train calling every hour at Marseille Provence Airport, the construction of a new underground train station in downtown Marseille, a new high speed stop in Marseille's Eastern Districts, and the enlargement of Toulon, Nice Côte d'Azur Airport and Nice Ville train stations.

Rolling stock

Multiple units
 SNCF Class Z 23500
 SNCF Class Z 26500
 SNCF Class B 81500 Also called BGC B 81500
 SNCF Class X 76500 Also called XGC Z 76500

Locomotives
 SNCF Class BB 22200
 SNCF Class BB 25500
 SNCF Class BB 67400

See also 

Transport express régional
Réseau Ferré de France
List of SNCF stations in Provence-Alpes-Côte d'Azur

References

External links 
 

 
Rail transport in Provence-Alpes-Côte d'Azur